Cotychroma acaguassu is a species of beetle in the family Cerambycidae, the only species in the genus Cotychroma.

References

Callichromatini